Farmville is an unincorporated community in Gordon County, in the U.S. state of Georgia.

History
A post office called Farmville was established in 1889, and remained in operation until being discontinued in 1907. The name is probably descriptive.

References

Unincorporated communities in Gordon County, Georgia
Unincorporated communities in Georgia (U.S. state)